St Cecilia's Church, Girton is a Grade II listed parish church in the Church of England in Girton, Nottinghamshire.

History

The church dates from the 13th century, and was largely rebuilt in 1879 by Ewan Christian..

It is part of a group of parishes which includes 
St Bartholomew's Church, Langford
St Giles' Church, Holme
All Saints' Church, Harby
St George the Martyr's Church, North & South Clifton
All Saints' Church, Collingham
St John the Baptist's Church, Collingham
St Helena's Church, South Scarle
Holy Trinity Church, Besthorpe
St Helen's Church, Thorney
All Saints' Church, Winthorpe

References

Church of England church buildings in Nottinghamshire
Grade II listed churches in Nottinghamshire